Anne of Veldenz ( – 18 November 1439 in Wachenheim) was a Countess suo jure of Veldenz.  She was a member of the Hohengeroldseck family, the second family to rule Veldenz.

Life 
Anna was the heiress of Frederick III, Count of Veldenz, the last from the Hohengeroldseck family to rule the county, and his wife Margaret of Nassau-Saarbrücken.  In 1409, she married Stephen, Count Palatine of Simmern-Zweibrücken, thereby bringing the County of Veldenz into the possession of the Dukes of Palatinate-Zweibrücken.  She also brought a 50% share in the County of Sponheim into the marriage.  The Counts of Veldenz had acquired this share in 1425, as had been predicted by Count John V of Sponheim-Starkenburg in the 1425 Treaty of Sponheim.  Anna's eldest son Frederick I would inherit her share in the County of Sponheim, her son Louis I would inherit the County of Veldenz proper.

In the 19th century, a descendant of Anna became King of Bavaria, which is why the Veldenz lion is now part of the Bavarian coat of arms.

Issue 
From her marriage with Stephen, Anna had the following children:
 Anne (1413 – 12 March 1455)
 Margaret (1416 – 23 November 1426)
 Frederick I (24 April 1417 – 29 November 1480)
 Rupert (1420 – 17 October 1478)
 Stephen (1421 – 4 September 1485)
 Louis I (1424 – 19 July 1489)
 John (1429–1475)

Anna
German countesses
Anna
1390 births
1439 deaths
14th-century German nobility
14th-century German women
15th-century German nobility
15th-century German women